The Nigerian National Assembly delegation from Kaduna comprises three Senators representing Kaduna Central Kaduna North, and Kaduna South, and fifteen Representatives representing Birnin-Gwari/Giwa,  Lere,  Zangon Kataf/Jaba,  Jema'a/Sanga,  Kaura,  Kauru,  Igabi,  Chikun/Kajuru,  Kachia/Kagarko,  Kaduna South,  Makarfi/Kudan,  Ikara/Kubau,  Kaduna North,  Soba,  Zaria Federal.

Fourth Republic

The 9th Parliament (2019 - 2023)

The 4th Parliament (1999 - 2003)

References
Official Website - National Assembly House of Representatives (Kaduna State)
 Senator List

Kaduna State
National Assembly (Nigeria) delegations by state